Hard Rock Hotel & Casino Bristol is a future casino and hotel in Bristol, Virginia, slated to be officially open in 2024. Located at the former Bristol Mall, which operated from 1975–2017, the casino will utilize the existing facility and expand upon it with a hotel and outdoor amphitheater. On July 8, 2022, the temporary Bristol Casino had a soft open at the site.

History
Hard Rock Casino announced in December 2021 that construction commenced on a temporary casino in the mall. This casino opened on July 8, 2022 as "Bristol Casino - Future Home of Hard Rock" at the former Bristol Mall in Bristol, Virginia. Bristol Casino will operate until construction is completed on the final Hard Rock Hotel Casino Bristol.

References

External links
 

Hard Rock Cafe
Casinos in Virginia
Buildings and structures in Bristol, Virginia
2022 establishments in Virginia